Phragmipedium besseae is a species of orchid in the genus Phragmipedium. It is a terrestrial plant native to the wet montane forests on the eastern slope of the Andes in Colombia, Ecuador, and Peru.

Description 
It has 13–30 cm long, 2–5 cm wide, dull green, keeled leaves. The inflorescence is 1-6 flowered, opening sequentially, up to 50 cm long, brown, pilose. It has flowers 6–9 cm wide, 1 to 2" (4 to 6.5 cm), pouch with translucent windows. Phragmipedium besseae produces long rhizomes.

References

External links 

}
besseae
Orchids of Colombia
Orchids of Ecuador
Orchids of Peru
Terrestrial orchids